The 1998 CONCACAF U-20 Tournament served as qualification for the 1999 FIFA World Youth Championship in Nigeria. The tournament took place from 5 August–10 October, although qualification started before.

Qualified teams

The following teams qualified for the tournament:

Squads

Final stage

Group A

Group B

See also
 1998 CONCACAF U-20 Tournament qualifying

References

External links
 RSSSF.com – Central American Qualifying for 1999 U-21 World Cup

1998
U-20 Tournament
1998 in youth association football